Hirscher is a German surname. Notable people with the surname include:

 Apollonia Hirscher (died 1547), Transylvanian Saxon merchant
 Johann Baptist von Hirscher (1788–1865), German Catholic theologian
 Marcel Hirscher (born 1989), Austrian alpine skier

German-language surnames